The Association of Professional Design Firms (APDF) is a U.S. national professional association of firms working within the allied fields of design. Emphasis is on the mutual exchange of information towards the successful operation of a design firm. The organization was founded in 1985 and is headquartered in Chicago. The executive director was Cathy Brownlee. The organization described itself as the business resource for design firms.

Mission statement
The Association of Professional Design Firms describes it mission as

Publications
The Association of Professional Design Firms publishes an annual comparative financial performance survey titled APDF Financial Performance Survey, a metrics-based guide for financial systems called The Financial Handbook for Design Firms, and Contract Terms and Conditions Reference For Product Design Consultants, a guide of contractual terms and conditions. The APDF also publishes Biz Brief, a monthly magazine and Design Biz, a twice a year review of firm ownership and management issues, events, forum reports, interviews, and member profiles.

Design institutions
Professional associations based in the United States
Business and industry organizations based in Chicago